The 2021–22 Vanderbilt Commodores men's basketball team represented Vanderbilt University during the 2021–22 NCAA Division I men's basketball season. The team was led by third-year head coach Jerry Stackhouse, and played their home games at Memorial Gymnasium in Nashville, Tennessee as a member of the Southeastern Conference. They finished the season 19–16, 7–11 in SEC Play to finish in eleventh place. They defeated Georgia and Alabama to advance to the quarterfinals of the SEC tournament where they lost to Kentucky. They received an at-large bid to the National Invitation Tournament where they defeated Belmont and Dayton to advance to the quarterfinals where they lost to Xavier.

Previous season
In a season limited due to the ongoing COVID-19 pandemic, the Commodores finished the 2020–21 season 9–16, 3–13 in SEC play to finish in last place. They defeated Texas A&M in the first round of the SEC tournament, but lost to Florida in the second round.

Offseason

Departures

Incoming Transfers

2021 recruiting class

2022 recruiting class

Roster

Schedule and results

|-
!colspan=12 style=| Non-conference regular season

|-
!colspan=12 style=| SEC regular season

|-
!colspan=12 style=| SEC tournament

|-
!colspan=12 style=| NIT tournament

Source

See also
2021–22 Vanderbilt Commodores women's basketball team

References

Vanderbilt Commodores men's basketball seasons
Vanderbilt Commodores
Vanderbilt Commodores men's basketball
Vanderbilt Commodores men's basketball
Vanderbilt